Walker Township is a township in Vernon County, in the U.S. state of Missouri.

Walker Township takes its name from the community of Walker, Missouri.

References

Townships in Missouri
Townships in Vernon County, Missouri